The fifth season of the Greek reality show Just the 2 of Us began airing on September 25, 2021 on Alpha TV, for the first time.

From the previous season, main host Nikos Koklonis and the judges Despina Vandi, Maria Bakodimou, Stamatis Fasoulis and Vicky Stavropoulou, all returned. The backstage host from the previous season, Laura Karaiskou didn't return and her place was taken by a contestant from the first season of the show, Katerina Stikoudi.

It was revealed that season five would have 14 contestants.

Judges
Despina Vandi, singer, actress.
Maria Bakodimou, television presenter.
Stamatis Fasoulis, actor.
Vicky Stavropoulou, actress.

Couples

Scoring chart

Red numbers indicate the lowest score for each week
Green numbers indicate the highest score for each week
 the couple eliminated that week
 the returning couple finishing in the bottom two/three
 indicates the couple which was immune from elimination
 indicates the couple that didn't perform due to personal reasons
 the winning couple
 the runner-up couple
 the third-place couple

Average score chart 
This table only counts for performances scored on a traditional 40-points scale.

Weekly scores

Week 1: Launch show
 Musical guest: Vasilis Karras

Week 2
Due to a COVID-19 infection, Dimitris & Kelly, Ioanna & Nikiforos, Marinos & Eleni and Nikos & Evelina were unable to perform. Under the rules of the show, they were given a bye to the following week.

No elimination took place.
 Musical guest: Petros Iakovidis

Week 3
Due to her ongoing COVID-19 infection, Kelly Kelekidou could not return as singer partner for Dimitris Alexandrou. His singer partner for the third week was Eleni Hatzidou. Also Marinos & Eleni were unable to perform. Under the rules of the show, they were given a bye to the following week.

 Musical guest: Themis Adamantidis

Week 4
Katerina Kainourgiou replaced Stikoudi in this episode, because of her pregnancy.

 Musical guest: Dionisis Shinas
 Musical guest: Katerina Stanisi

Week 5
Katerina Kainourgiou replaced Stikoudi in this episode, because of her pregnancy.

 Musical guest: Stan
 Musical guest: Konstantinos Pantelidis
 Musical guest: Harry Varthakouris
 Musical guest: Eleni Dimou

Week 6
 Musical guest: Nina Mazani
 Musical guest: Triantaphillos
 Musical guest: Antypas

Ratings

Note

  Outside top 20.

References

External links
 Official website of Just the 2 of Us

2021 Greek television seasons
2022 Greek television seasons